Arné is a commune in the Hautes-Pyrénées department in southwestern France.

Geography
The river Gesse has its source in the southern part of the commune and forms most of its eastern border.

Population

See also
Communes of the Hautes-Pyrénées department

References

Communes of Hautes-Pyrénées